The Orange Movement (Movimento Arancione, MA) was a political party in Italy.

It was launched on 12 December 2012 by Luigi de Magistris, mayor of Naples and until then member of Italy of Values (IdV). The founding convention of the party was attended by Antonio Ingroia (by telephone) and the leaders of the Communist Refoundation Party, the Party of Italian Communists and the Federation of the Greens.

References

External links
Official website

2012 establishments in Italy
2017 disestablishments in Italy
Anti-corruption parties
Defunct political parties in Italy
Political parties disestablished in 2017
Political parties established in 2012